Vasillaq is an Albanian masculine given name and may refer to:
Vasillaq Ngresi, Albanian politician
Vasillaq Vangjeli (1948–2011), Albanian actor
Vasillaq Zëri (born 1952), Albanian footballer 

Albanian masculine given names